WGTM was an AM radio station licensed to and located in Wilson, North Carolina.  Named for the World's Greatest Tobacco Market, WGTM was founded in the 1930s by the Wilson Tobacco Board of Trade. The station originally transmitted at 1310 kc. and last operated on 590 kHz with 5000 watts full-time. 106.7 WGTM-FM was silenced by Hurricane Hazel which destroyed the tower in October 1954.

Owned by Campbell Broadcasting in the 1960s until 1985, WGTM had a block-type format, featuring local news, country, AC, gospel, & rock. It was then sold to Willis Broadcasting and the format changed to black gospel and talk, with Red Hot Issues weekday mornings with host and owner Celestine Willis and Tawanna Fields.

The studios were located in the back of a church supply store on Hwy 42 West of Wilson. The transmitter site is near Rock Ridge and features a 4 tower array that covers a large part of eastern North Carolina.

In the 1950s and '60s the studios were located on US Highway 301 and later just off of I-95.  Many singers and entertainers were known to stop by the studios while traveling through and drop off their latest record or do a quick interview.  WGTM also featured one of the first African American D.J.s in the south, Ted Hooker.  Hooker hosted Ebony Hit Parade and the Sepia Serenade later at night.  Also a first for the Wilson station was a live teenage program which remoted from the Melody Park Fun land off of Highway 301 North of town.  Dick Ellis took requests live from the local teens during the program Night Beat. The park featured a broadcast booth on top of the former drive-in-theatre snack bar and a "stove-pipe-blower" devise that would send written song requests up to a basket in the booth from the dance floor. Each year, the winners of the yearly dance contest held at the park would win a free trip to appear on the Dick Clark American Bandstand show in Philly.

Hosts/announcers from the 1960s, 1970s, 1980s, 1990s, and early 2000s include Bill Bunn, Roger Philyaw, John Tew who was hired in 1965 to spearhead the "BIG SWITCH" which took the station to a full time top 40 format. Dick Ellis, Jim Rochelle, Buck Jones, Ted Hooker, Thomas Ward, Jim Apple, Steve Roberts, Vann Campbell, Tom Campbell, Mike McAllister, Mark Six, Mac McKee, Wes Daniel, Frank Silverthorne, Don Flowers, Golden Boy, W.Frank Neal, Isiaette McArn, Dan Wilkins, Jay Carter, Doretha Kent, Nettie Taylor, Tonette Woodard, and Nick Rogers. Its sportscasters included Carlester Crumpler and Alton Britt. During the early 1980s, Greg Flowers was the news director and Ben Lovelace was the farm news director.

WGTM moved from its longtime studio on NC 42 West in mid-2009. The building has a "For Sale" sign posted in front, and the decades-old STL tower has been removed. In November the station was forced from the air when the power was cut to the transmitter site by the local power company. WGTM returned to the air from a rented studio in December 2009 and fell silent again on March 13, 2010.

WGTM was deleted by the Federal Communications Commission (FCC) on December 2, 2011, for failure to file for the renewal of its license (which expired a day earlier).

References

GTM
Wilson, North Carolina
Defunct radio stations in the United States
Radio stations disestablished in 2011
2011 disestablishments in North Carolina
GTM